The  is a river in Chiba Prefecture, Japan. Under the Rivers Act of 1906 the Isumi is designated as a Class 2 River. Additionally, the government has designated the Isumi River a national-level .

Geography
The source of the Isumi River is in the Kamiueno District of Katsuura City. It meanders through Ōtaki and Isumi City and pours into the Pacific Ocean south of Cape Taitō in the Misakichoizumi District in the northeast of Isumi City. The riverbed consists primarily of shale and has few sandy areas.

Tributaries

 Koshinden River
 Nishihata River
 Ōno River
 Ochiai River
 Matsumaru River
 Kamioki River
 Shiigi River
 Ebado River
 Shin River

Ecology

Two species of oak are found on the upper parts of the river and Japanese cedar on the middle and lower parts of the river. The riverbanks of the Isumi are known for their dense bamboo thickets. Fish in the river include the endangered Tokyo bitterling, ayu, medaka, freshwater eel, Japanese dace, and other species of carp. Chiba Prefecture is carrying out some work on improving the environment of the Isumi River in Ōtaki area.

Use

The middle and lower parts of the river provide extensive irrigation to paddy fields, which have historically made the area rich in rice production. The Isumi Line of the Isumi Railroad Company largely follows the course of the river. Historically the Isumi River provided a natural defense of Ōtaki Castle and its associated jōkamachi castle town.

External links

第8回夷隅川流域委員会: 夷隅川水系河川整備計画（案）環境編について

References

Rivers of Chiba Prefecture
Rivers of Japan